Butel is a neighbourhood in Skopje, Macedonia, the seat of Butel Municipality.

Notable people with the surname Butel include:
Anaïg Butel (born 1992), French football player, sister of Gwenaëlle Butel
Jane Butel, American cook and food writer
Janet S. Butel, American virologist
Michel Butel (1940–2018), French journalist and novelist
Mitchell Butel (born 1970), Australian actor
Philip Butel (born 1980), Filipino basketball player